Bubble Bobble Part 2, known in Japan as  is a game in the Bubble Bobble series. While it was never released in the arcade, two versions of the game were developed independently from each other (for the NES and Game Boy systems), with each game receiving a different story line as a result.

Plot

According to the NES version's manual, this game stars Bub and Bob, the original duo. On the game's back cover, they are also said to be Cubby and Rubby, Bub and Bob's descendants.

As seen in the game intro, Bub, and a girl named Judy, were sitting in a park. Suddenly, a floating skull character, who is one of the Skull Brothers, captures Judy into a bubble, and sends her and Bub into the air. Two characters named Drunk (from the original Bubble Bobble) follow the skull and take Judy away. Bub turns (or is turned) into a bubble dragon and heads off to rescue his girlfriend.
There is also a two-player mode, implying that Bob has suffered the same events as Bub had. However, the manual states that Judy is a friend of both.

In the Game Boy version, a character named Robby has to rescue people from a village, who, according to this version's intro, have been captured by a skull character.

Gameplay

For both the NES and Game Boy versions, the gameplay remains largely unchanged from the other games in the series. However, the player has the ability to float upward to higher platforms and over walls by holding down the B button. In the NES release, unlike the original Bubble Bobble and many other games in the series, the 2-player mode has players take turns across levels, rather than cooperatively play through them simultaneously.

In the NES version only, there are three bonus games which are located after the player defeats a boss, or through a certain door.

Reception

Power Unlimited gave the Game Boy version a score of 75% writing: "This kind of mind sport is ideal for the Game Boy. It can seem a bit simple at times, and sometimes gets a bit boring, but you have to use your head if you want to get through it. A fun game if you persevere.

References

External links

1993 video games
Game Boy games
Nintendo Entertainment System games
Platform games
Taito games
Bubble Bobble
Video game sequels
OLM, Inc.
Video games developed in Japan